Adrián Claudio Marini (born 14 October 1972) is an Argentine football manager and former player who played as a midfielder. He is the current manager of Colón's reserve team.

Playing career
Born in Santa Fe, Marini began his career with Colón, scoring the goal which sealed the club's promotion to Primera División in 1995. He subsequently represented Motagua, Quilmes, All Boys and Toros Neza before retiring with San Martín de San Juan in 2003.

Managerial career
On 5 February 2021, after several years working in the youth categories, Marini was named manager of the reserve side of Colón. On 8 July 2022, he was named interim manager of the main squad after Julio César Falcioni left.

Marini returned to his previous role after the appointment of Sergio Rondina, but was again interim after Rondina was sacked in August. On 29 August, he was permanently appointed manager.

References

External links

1972 births
Living people
Footballers from Santa Fe, Argentina
Argentine footballers
Association football midfielders
Argentine Primera División players
Club Atlético Colón footballers
Quilmes Atlético Club footballers
All Boys footballers
San Martín de San Juan footballers
F.C. Motagua players
Toros Neza footballers
Argentine football managers
Argentine Primera División managers
Club Atlético Colón managers
Argentine expatriate footballers
Argentine expatriate sportspeople in Honduras
Argentine expatriate sportspeople in Mexico
Expatriate footballers in Honduras
Expatriate footballers in Mexico